Hammaren  is a small mountain of Troms og Finnmark, in northern Norway. It is located on the northern coast of the island Kvaløya in Hammerfest municipality.

References 

Mountains of Troms og Finnmark
Hammerfest